= Jimmy Westerheim =

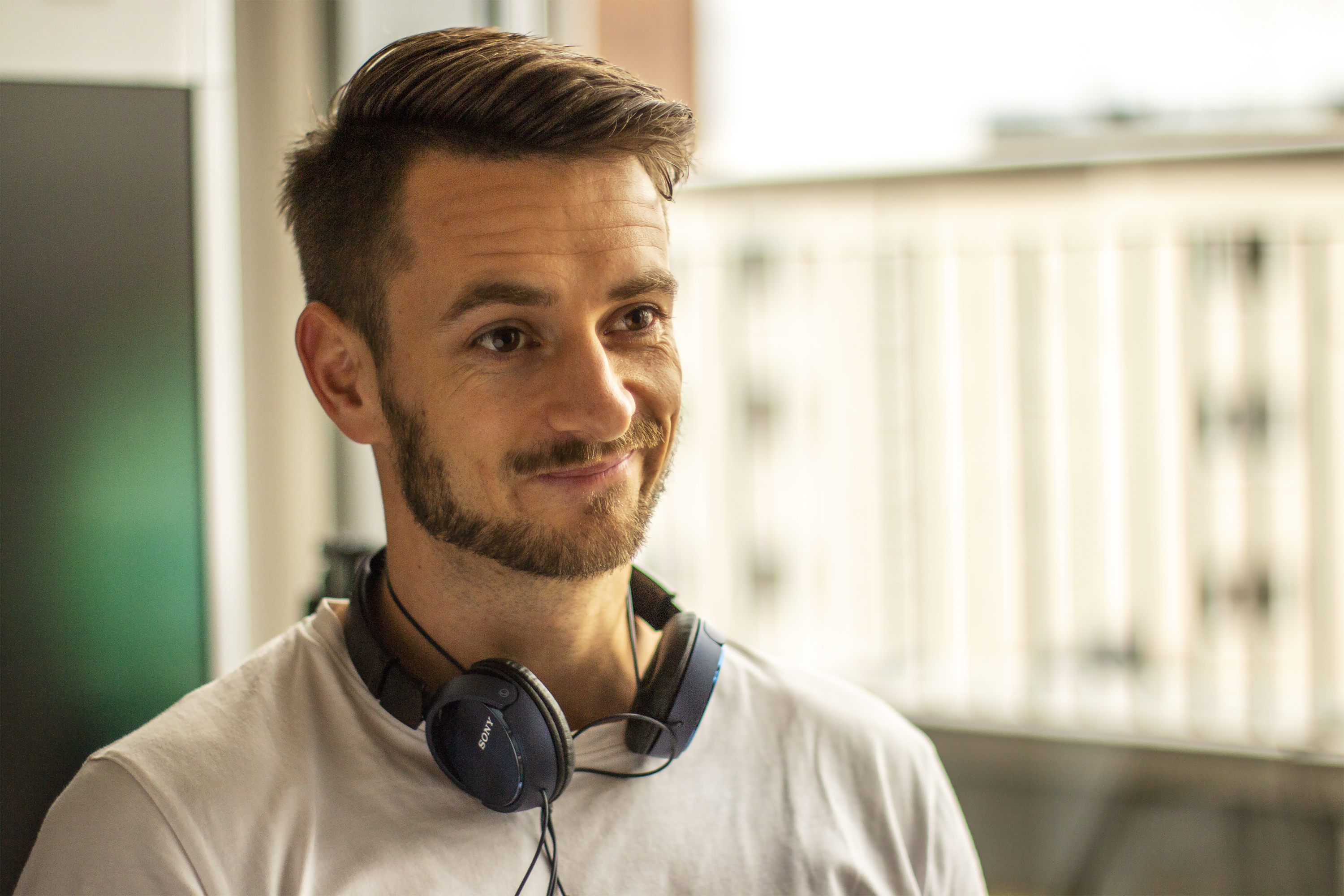
- Born: Jimmy Ruben Sylow Westerheim
- Known for: Founder of The Human Aspect Foundation

Jimmy Ruben Sylow Westerheim (born January 17, 1987) is the founder and CEO of the non-profit organisation The Human Aspect.

Through Westerheim's experience working for Doctors Without Borders in Syria and Afghanistan, he became interested in creating a tool to share life lessons across the world. Westerheim founded The Human Aspect foundation when he left his careers in shipping and humanitarian work to self fund the mental health video project. Westerheim has himself faced mental health challenges, citing his biological father that did not want anything to do with him and being bullied as a child, which led him to plan to take his own life at the age of 13.

Since founding The Human Aspect in 2016 Westerheim has traveled as a speaker and interviewing for the foundation in multiple different countries such as The United Kingdom, Sierra Leone and Ukraine. In addition to talk to local health authorities about how to get more people in need to use the countries help services.
